The first coins of the Indonesian rupiah were issued in 1951 and 1952, a year or so later than the first Indonesian rupiah banknotes printed, following the peace treaty with the Netherlands in November 1949. Although revolutionary currency had been issued by the provisional  Indonesiam government between 1945 and 1949, it had all been formed of paper, for metal were too scarce for the internationally isolated government to use as currency.

Due to high inflation in the late 1950s and early 1960s, no coins were minted after 1961, and that which remained in circulation were effectively worthless.

A devalued 'new rupiah' was issued in an attempt to tame inflation in 1965, with banknotes in denominations all the way from Rp0.01 (1 cent) up to Rp100 - no coins were struck at this time. By 1971, however, the economy, and inflation, under Suharto's New Order was stable, and coinage was once again issued, in denominations of Rp1, Rp5, Rp10, Rp25 and Rp50, with Rp100 coins added two years later. Due to inflation, the current coinage now consists of Rp25, Rp50, Rp100, Rp200, Rp500 and Rp1,000, although older Rp1 coins remain officially legal tender for completeness.

Unlike coinage of the Netherlands Indian gulden (which in higher denominations were made of silver or gold), circulating rupiah coinage has always been formed of base metal.

Cent (sen) coinage of the rupiah (1951–1961)

For the first couple of years until sufficient coins had been issued, government cent notes were circulated, of Rp0.10, Rp0.25 and Rp0.50 denominations. No lower denominations were printed, but the old bronze Netherlands Indies gulden coins of ½, 1 and 2½ cents remained as legal tender (higher denominations, starting from 1/20 gulden (5 cents), had been silver, with greater intrinsic metal value).

Coinage, issued in 1951 and 1952, and from then until 1961, replaced the notes as sufficient coinage entered circulation. Under Indonesian law originally enacted by the Dutch, the government was responsible for the issue of money with values below Rp5 (in Dutch times gulden), and hence all coins bore the name of Indonesia, rather than the central bank.

The denominations were Rp0.01, Rp0.05, Rp0.10, Rp0.25 and Rp0.50. The Rp0.01 and Rp0.05 coins had centre holes, similar to the old copper coins of the Dutch, while the other coins were solid. All were aluminium except the Rp0.50, which was cupronickel. Rp0.01 coins were effectively worthless, and only a token number of 100,000 were minted, all dated 1952. Rp0.05 coins were more useful and were also minted dated 1954, as were the Rp0.10 coins.

From 1954, Indonesia began to stop using the Jawi script, which had been a feature of the coins of the Netherlands Indies as well as of past Islamic sultanates in the archipelago. The Rp0.50 coin was the first to be changed, with the Arabic text simply removed from the coin for its 1954-dated minting.

The Rp0.25 coin was the next to have the Arabic removed, with "INDONESIA" replacing its Jawi equivalent for the second minting of the coin, dated 1955 (the Rp0.50 coin was also minted that year).

Inflation meant that the smallest denomination to be minted after 1954 was the Rp0.10, which likewise had Arabic removed from its reverse for its third minting, 1957; Rp0.25 and Rp0.50 coins were also minted in 1957.

After 1957, the cupronickel Rp0.50 coin was debased to aluminium, the same metal as the lower denomination coins (which were never minted again). As a result of this, the Rp0.50 coin, previously the heaviest, but second-smallest coin - slightly larger than the Rp0.01 coin, was now the largest coin in circulation (albeit lighter than its predecessor).

25 rupiah gold coin

A variation of the 1952 Rp0.50 coin was issued in gold with an official value of Rp25 (although with no value on the coin). The coin varied from the Rp0.50 coin by featuring the logo "BEKERDJA-MENABUNG-MEMBANGUN" (WORKING-SAVING-BUILDING) and the Garuda emblem instead of the year and denomination. Like the other 1951–1952 coins, this one has the mintmark of Utrecht.

One Indonesian ringgit equals Rp2½
Indonesians have an old proverb: seringgit si dua kupang, setali si tiga uang (1 ringgit is 2 kupangs, 1 tali is 3 moneys). The proverb refers to the Indonesian names of coins and currency units before 17 August 1945. As Widarto claims keping also cepeng, hepeng = ¼ cents, peser = 1/200 rupiah = ½ cents, cent = 1/100 rupiah, pincang = 1½ cents but no coin was ever issued in this value, gobang = 1/40 rupiah = 2 1/2 cents, kelip = 1/20 rupiah = 5 cents, ketip also picis, ketit = 1/10 rupiah = 10 cents, tali = 1/4 rupiah = 25 cents = 3 uang which means money, ukan also ukon = 1/2 rupiah = 50 cents, rupiah was a value equal to the 1 guilder of Hindia-Belanda, the Netherlands Indies, kupang = 1/2 ringgit = 1 1/4 rupiah, benggol = seringgit = 1 ringgit = 2 1/2 rupiah = 2 1/2 Netherlands Indies guilder. The uang although it means money in Indonesian was merely a value of 1/3 tali = 8 1/3 cents but no coin was ever issued in this value. The Kupang gave its name to an Indonesian city in southwest of Timor. The coin was made of gold, circulated in Aceh, Sulawesi and Malayan states in some forms, for centuries.

In 1963 Indonesia Issued a coin of 2 1/2 rupiah depicting Sukarno in two forms, one of the coins was intended for West Irian, the other was intended for entire Indonesia, but both coins were minted in very limited quantities. Their values according to Krause catalogue are US$290 for the first coin and US$100 for the Irian coin. While NGC online catalogue evaluate one of the coins as worth US$290. West Irian coin is evaluated as US$100, and never placed into circulation, maybe because of hyperinflation that ruled Indonesian economy in Sukarno era, especially during the years 1959 to 1965.

Rupiah coinage of the rupiah (1971-)

1971–1973: reintroduction of coins to Indonesia
With the raging inflation of the 1960s very much under control at this point, coin issuing resumed after a 10-year hiatus, and coins were issued on 1 January 1971, of denominations Rp1, Rp2 and Rp5, all in aluminium. Rp10, Rp25, and Rp50 cupronickel coins were added on 5 April 1971. The coins featured the wording "Bank Indonesia", a large "1" with "rupiah" underneath, and the year "1970" (Rp1, Rp2, and Rp5 coins) or "1971" (Rp10, Rp25, Rp50 coins) on its obverse.

The reverse of the coins showed "Rp 1", "Rp 5", "Rp 10", "Rp 25", "Rp 50", plus various designs: white-browed fantail (1rp), rice and cotton stalk (2rp), black drongo bird (5rp), rice and cotton stalk with Indonesian wording "TINGKATKAN PRODUKSI SANDANG PANGAN" ("increase the product of clothing and food") (10rp), Victoria crowned pigeon (25rp), and greater bird of paradise (50rp). The final mintages of these coins were: 136 million (1 rupiah), 139 million (2 rupiah), 448 million (5 rupiah), 286 million (10 rupiah), 1.22 billion (25 rupiah) and 1 billion (50 rupiah).

The 10 rupiah coin was issued as part of the UN Food and Agriculture Organization coins and medals program, an international issue by ultimately 114 countries. A variety of coin sets were sold to coin collectors to raise money for the UN's food program. In addition to the sale to collectors, the vast majority of the 10 rupiah coins were used within Indonesia - in addition to some rarer coins (none of which were issued in Indonesia) the FAO wanted low denomination circulating coinage that called for increasing food production.

At the time the exchange rate was 378 rupiah to the US$, so the smallest coin was worth approximately 1/4 of a US cent (note however that the 1 and 2 rupiah coins were never reissued, and hence the 5 rupiah coin was shortly to become the smallest denomination).

The coin selection was extended with a '1973'-dated cupro-nickel 100 rupiah coin of large size showing a Minangkabau tribal house, which was issued on 2 January 1974, at which time the coin was worth about US$0.24. A total of 913 million of these coins were minted, some of which are still found in circulation today.

As a result of the successful re-establishment of coinage in Indonesia, notes below 100 rupiah were withdrawn in Indonesia permanently from 1 September 1975 (at which point the exchange rate was fixed at 415 rupiah to the dollar, hence the largest denomination banknote to be withdrawn, the 50 rupiah note, was worth around US$0.10).

1971 INDONESIAN COINS:

1974: coin redesigns

The 5 rupiah aluminium coin was revised dated 1974, the obverse changing only the date, but the reverse depicting the logo of KB ('Keluarga Berencana', aka family planning', a movement first established by the Indonesian government in 1970), i.e. a 2-parent, 2-child family with rice and cotton stalk and letters KB, with the text 'KELUARGA BERENCANA' ('family planning') 'MENUJU KESEJAHTERAAN RAKYAT' ('for the welfare of the people'). 448 million were minted.

The 10 rupiah was enlarged substantially dated 1974, with the composition changed to brass-clad steel, with the obverse unchanged, and the reverse changed to show the symbol of Tabanas, the government's 1970-established national savings scheme,  and the slogan 'MENABUNG UNTUK MENUNJANG PEMBANGUNAN' ('save to support development') 223 million were minted.

Both of these coins were also sold to collectors as part of UN FAO sets.

1978–1979: updated coinage

The 1973 100 rupiah was given an updated reverse design in 1978, reading 'HUTAN UNTUK KESEJAHTERAAN' (Forest for welfare), '1978' and a motif of the gunungan wayang. The coin was also made thinner, although its dimensions did not change. This was the fourth and final Indonesian FAO coin.

The 1974 5 rupiah, meanwhile, was updated '1979', issued from March 1980, retaining its family planning message, but adding a circular decoration to both reverse and obverse of the coin, and being shrunk in size from 3.0 to 1.4 grams, presumably to cut the cost of production. 413 million coins were minted dated 1978, while 5 million were later issued dated 1995 and 1996.

The 1974 10 rupiah was similarly updated with decoration to '1979', enlarged with the composition changed to aluminium. 286 million were minted with this date. No 10 rupiah coins have since been issued.

1991: updated coinage

From 1979, no new coin designs were made in Indonesia until 1991. For new coinage, the old style of a large number was replaced instead with the national Garuda Pancasila logo, with the year and "BANK INDONESIA" in smaller text below the emblem.

A 25 rupiah coin dated 1991 in aluminium, with images of nutmeg and its Indonesian text 'buah pala' and "Rp 25" on the reverse, was the smallest coin to be revised. The same coin was also minted 1992–1996, with mintages each year of 30, 64, 20, 250, 185, and 5 million. No 25 rupiah coins have been issued since 1996.

50 rupiah backed with a Komodo dragon and text 'Komodo' was issued in aluminium-bronze, dated 1991, and later 1992, 1993, 1994, 1995, 1996, 1997 and 1998. Mintages were 67, 120, 300, then 590 million, then 150,000 each year.

The 100 rupiah, also aluminium-bronze was inscribed with an octagon, featuring the reverse design of running bulls with the text karapan sapi (bull racing). The coin was minted 1991 through 1998, with respective mintages of 94, 120, 300, 550, 799, 41, 150, and 56 million.

A 500 rupiah coin, also in aluminium-bronze, became the first new coin denomination since 1973, with a value at issue of around US$0.20. The coin depicted on its reverse the jasmine flower with the text "bunga melati". This coin was minted dated 1991 and 1992, with mintages of 71 million then 100 million.

1993: 1,000 rupiah coin introduced

1993 extended the range of coin denominations, adding Rp1,000, then worth around US$0.40 a bimetallic coin of copper-nickel and aluminium-bronze. This coin depicts an oil palm (Indonesian: kelapa sawit), and bears the mint years of 1993, 1994, 1995, 1996, 1997 and 2000.

1997–1999: coin revisions
The 500 rupiah coin was updated '1997' with a smaller jasmine leaf above a large central '500' with smaller lower 'rupiah', and the same aluminium-bronze material. The coin was minted dated 1997, 2000, 2001, 2002 and 2003.

The next coin design, was '1999' 50 rupiah coin, which was struck in aluminium showing the black-naped oriole. As with the 500 rupiah, the reverse of the coin has a larger numerical denomination. Dates are 1999, 2001 and 2002.

The 100 rupiah coin was also altered in the same manner to aluminium from '1999', depicting the palm cockatoo. Mint dates are each year from 1999 through 2005.

2003: coin revisions

The next coin revisions in Indonesia are of 2003.

The 200 rupiah coin in aluminium, depicting the Bali starling 'jalak bali' was introduced as a new denomination in the same style as the 50 and 100 rupiah coins, dated '2003', while the jasmine 500 rupiah coin was again redesigned, with its metal changed to aluminium and its size enlarged.

2010: 1,000 rupiah update coinage 
Along with launched the revision (2005 issue) of 10,000 rupiah in 2010, Bank Indonesia updated the 1,000 rupiah coin, featuring the reverse design of Angklung and Gedung Sate in background. The coin was issued in nickel-plated steel, replacing the previous coin.

2016: coin revisions

The most recent coin revisions in Indonesia occurred in December 2016. The new coins were released along with the new banknotes. For the first time, 
there are actual people depicted in non-commemorative coins. Herman Johannes is depicted for 100 rupiah, Tjipto Mangoenkoesoemo on 200 rupiah, T. B. Simatupang on 500 rupiah, and I Gusti Ketut Pudja on 1,000 rupiah coins.

Circulating coinage of the Indonesian rupiah

There are presently two series of coins in circulation: light-weight aluminium and nickel-plated steel coins from 1999-2010 and 2016 National Heroes of Indonesia series. Although several coins from 1990s issue is officially legal tender, but now it is rarely used.

Due to the low value and general shortage of small denomination coins (below 50 rupiah), it is common to receive sweets in lieu of the last few rupiah of change in supermarkets and stores, a practice that is illegal under Indonesian law. The 1 rupiah coin is officially legal tender for completeness' sake, but is not circulated as it is effectively worthless.

Commemorative coins

Although circulating coins in Indonesia have never been made from precious metals, a number of special issues have been made since coins were reintroduced to Indonesia in 1970 from either silver or gold. As commemorative coins, they were all sold above their intrinsic value, and also above their nominal value.

All the coins struck are proof coinage, with the exception of the WWF 1974 coinage which were issued in non-proof 50% silver, and proof and non-proof gold.

36,000 gold pieces of the 1952 50 sen were minted that year, with the obverse design replaced with the Garuda Pancasila and text "INDONESIA" "BERKERDJA MENABUNG MEMBANGUN".

With the exception of the WWF and Save the Children issues, which are in good supply, most of the coins are relatively scarce and command good premiums to their bullion value.

The following issues have been made:

References 

Indonesian rupiah